Jana Dítětová, née Kalabzová (7 October 1926 – 9 November 1991) was a Czechoslovak film actress. She appeared in 40 films between 1942 and 1988. She was married to Czech actor Josef Vinklář.

Selected filmography
 Happy Journey (1943)
 Spring Song (1944)
 The Wedding Ring (1944)
 A Kiss from the Stadium (1948)
 Steel Town (1950)
 Anna Proletářka (1950)
 May Events (1951)
 Dog's Heads (1955)
 The Joke (1969)
 Jak dostat tatínka do polepšovny (1978)
 Babičky dobíjejte přesně! (1984)

References

External links
 

1926 births
1993 deaths
Czech film actresses
Czech stage actresses
Czech television actresses
Actors from Plzeň
20th-century Czech actresses
Czechoslovak film actresses